The 247 cc BMW R27, introduced in 1960, is a shaft-driven, single-cylinder motorcycle manufactured by BMW.

History

After World War II, the Potsdam Agreement of the USSR, USA, and the UK, prohibited BMW Aktiengesellschaft (AG) from building motorcycles. Later, this ban was lifted and in 1948 BMW produced its first postwar motorcycle, the 250 cc R24, which was based largely on the prewar R23. It was the only postwar BMW motorcycle produced without a rear suspension. BMW introduced the R25 model, with plunger rear suspension, in 1950.  The last of the plunger models, the R25/3, was introduced in 1953.

R26

In 1956 BMW introduced a completely revamped single-cylinder engine, the R26 (engine numbers 340 001 – 370 236), with improvements paralleling those introduced at the same time in the boxer twins. The R26 came with an enclosed drive shaft, rear swingarm, and front Earles forks. A new headlight nacelle came with a sliding black plastic over the ignition key, and the “bell-bottom” front fender was dropped along with the mechanics' hand shifter. The engine of the R26 was bolted directly to the frame, and produced .

R27

The 250 cc OHV vertical single was the only rubber-mounted thumper engine BMW ever produced, and was their last shaft drive single-cylinder motorcycle. The engine pumped out , the highest ever for a shaft-drive BMW single. BMW manufactured 15,364 R27 models (engine numbers 372 001 – 387 566 ) over the production years of 1960 to 1966. Some of the 1966 R27 models were sold as 1967 models because dealers in those years often would assign dates to BMW motorcycles when they sold them, and not necessarily when they were manufactured.

BMW did things differently from other manufacturers. This is evident in the R27. Its enclosed shaft final drive is rare for a single cylinder motorcycle. But it also had a triangulated Earles front fork (named after English designer Ernest Earles); so the motorcycle had a front swing arm as well as a rear swing arm. When you squeezed the front brake lever hard not only did the front end not dive, it actually rose slightly. Thus, braking was a very steady activity, though the brakes were weak by today's standards. The engine's crankshaft was laid out fore-and-aft rather than side-to-side; also a rare feature. This way, the crank and the final shaft were in line, and drive forces did not have to be run through a set of 90-degree gears. Also, the kick starter swung out sideways instead of parallel to the frame.

Technical data

See also 
History of BMW motorcycles

Further reading

References

External links 

 BMW Einzylinder-Zentrum

R27
Shaft drive motorcycles
Motorcycles introduced in 1960